Sleep in the Water is the debut album by the Australian five-piece indie pop, dream band, Snakadaktal. It was released on 2 August 2013 through Liberation Music with Dann Hume producing. It peaked at No. 9 on the ARIA Albums Chart. Two singles were provided, "Hung on Tight" (June 2013) and "Fall Underneath" (November). In February 2014 The Sun II was released as an extended play, which included some remixes and unreleased songs from recording sessions for this album. The band had promoted it with a national tour in August to September 2013. It was the band's only studio album before splitting up in March 2014.

Recording and production

Sleep in the Water was produced by Dann Hume and recorded at his studio, The Stables Studios, in Melbourne during early 2013. All songs were written and performed by the band's members Joseph Clough on guitar and synthesisers, Phoebe Cockburn on vocals and synthesisers, Sean Heathcliff on vocals and guitar, Jarrah Mccarty-Smith on bass guitar, and Barna Nemeth on drums. They created a promotional web series on their YouTube account during its recording phase.

Critical response 

The album debuted and peaked at No. 9 on the ARIA Albums Chart, a leap from their self-titled EP issued in November 2011, which had entered at No. 78.

Sleep in the Water was received favourably, including high rotation at national youth radio station, Triple J. "Fall Underneath" was used on the Ministry of Sound's Chillout Sessions XVI. The band signed to Humming Records to have the album released in Germany, Austria and Switzerland in February 2014. It was also released on 12" vinyl, briefly available in a bundle that included their Treasures compilation and the self-titled EP, both on CD. For the promotion, the vinyl was coloured blue.

Track listing

Personnel 

Snakdakatal
 Joseph Clough: – guitar, synthesisers
 Phoebe Cockburn: – vocals, synthesisers
 Sean Heathcliff: – vocals, guitar
 Jarrah Mccarty-Smith: – bass guitar
 Barna Nemeth: – drums

Recording details
 Dann Hume: – producer, mixer at The Stables Studios, Melbourne.
 Alex Gooden: – audio engineer
 David Walker: – mastering engineer Stepford Audio, Melbourne

References

2013 debut albums
Snakadaktal albums